Pleasant Grove High School is a public high school located in Texarkana, Texas (United States). It is the sole high school in the Pleasant Grove Independent School District and is classified as a 4A school by the UIL. In 2015, the school was rated "Met Standard" by the Texas Education Agency.

Athletics
The Pleasant Grove Hawks compete in the following sports:

Baseball
Basketball
Cross Country
Football
Golf
Powerlifting
Soccer
Softball
Tennis
Track and Field
Volleyball

State Champions:

Football:
2017(4A/D2)
2019(4A/D2)
Baseball:
2010(3A)
2012(3A)
2020(4A) 
Cheerleading:
2017(4A)

References

External links
 Official website

Schools in Bowie County, Texas
Public high schools in Texas
Texarkana, Texas